Pookkanviduthi is a village in Kalathur panchayat in Thanjavur district in the state of Tamil Nadu.

Villages in Thanjavur district